The 2015–16 Czech Cup, known as the MOL Cup for sponsorship reasons, was the 23nd season of the annual knockout football tournament of the Czech Republic. It began with the preliminary round on 18 July 2015 and ended with the final on 18 May 2016. As winners of the cup, FK Mlada Boleslav gained the right to play in the third qualifying round of the 2016–17 UEFA Europa League.

Preliminary round
The preliminary round ties were scheduled for 18 – 19 July 2015. 66 teams competed in this round, all from level 4 or below of the Czech league system.

|-
!colspan="3" style="background:#ccccff;"|18 July 2015

|-
!colspan="3" style="background:#ccccff;"|19 July 2015

|}

First round
The first round ties were scheduled for 24 – 30 July 2015.

|-
!colspan="3" style="background:#ccccff;"|24 July 2015

|-
!colspan="3" style="background:#ccccff;"|25 July 2015

|-
!colspan="3" style="background:#ccccff;"|26 July 2015

|-
!colspan="3" style="background:#ccccff;"|30 July 2015

|}

Second round
The second round ties were scheduled for 26 August – 2 September 2015.

|-
!colspan="3" style="background:#ccccff;"|26 August 2015

|-
!colspan="3" style="background:#ccccff;"|27 August 2015

|-
!colspan="3" style="background:#ccccff;"|28 August 2015

|-
!colspan="3" style="background:#ccccff;"|29 August 2015

|-
!colspan="3" style="background:#ccccff;"|30 August 2015

|-
!colspan="3" style="background:#ccccff;"|2 September 2015

|}

Third round
The third round ties were scheduled for 22 September – 6 October 2015.

|-
!colspan="3" style="background:#ccccff;"|22 September 2015

|-
!colspan="3" style="background:#ccccff;"|23 September 2015

|-
!colspan="3" style="background:#ccccff;"|29 September 2015

|-
!colspan="3" style="background:#ccccff;"|30 September 2015

|-
!colspan="3" style="background:#ccccff;"|6 October 2015

|}

Fourth round

|}

Quarter-finals
The draw for the quarter-finals was held on 7 December 2015. The first legs were scheduled for 2 March, and the second legs for 16 March 2016.

|}

First legs

Second legs

Semi-finals

|}

First legs

Second legs

Final 

The final was played on 18 May 2016 at the Na Stínadlech stadium in Teplice between FK Mladá Boleslav and FK Jablonec.  Boleslav won 2–0 for their second Czech Cup win, adding to their victory in 2011.

See also
 2015–16 Czech First League
 2015–16 Czech National Football League

References

Czech Cup seasons
Cup
Czech